Chorisops tunisiae, is a European species of soldier fly.

Distribution
Algeria, Morocco, Portugal, Spain, Tunisia.

References

Stratiomyidae
Diptera of Africa
Diptera of Europe
Insects described in 1915
Taxa named by Theodor Becker